Istanbul Arel University is a private nonprofit university located in Istanbul, Turkey. It was established in 2007 by the Kemal Gözükara Education and Culture Foundation. Teaching is done mostly in English, and there are bachelor, masters and doctoral programmes.

History 
Arel College in Istanbul was founded in 1990 and in the course of the following years its educational spectrum was extended with the Arel Pre-School, Arel Primary School, Arel Anatolian High School, Arel Science High School and Arel Sports and Culture Complex. After 26 years the institute sought to further expand its activities to the university level.

With the help of the Kemal Goezükara Education and Culture Foundation it was possible to establish the Istanbul Arel University that was officially recognised by statute No. 2809/5656-Appendix. 76 of 9 May 2007, published in the official gazette No. 26526, of 18 May 2007.

Since 2018 Oezguer Goezuekara (the son of the benefactor) has been chairman of the Board of Trustees of Arel University. He is being helped by Hilmi Ibar to build an international network. In December 2018 an agreement with the  DHBW Loerrach was successfully established with the goal of establishing student and professorial exchanges and common educational projects.

The campus of the university is located in Büyükçekmece, Istanbul.

Faculties 
The university comprises (2018) the following faculties:
 Medicine, Dean Enver Duran
 Art and Science
 Visual Arts
 Economics and Administrative Science
 Communication
 Engineering Science and Architecture

Schools 
 School of Health Sciences
 School of Applied Science   
 School of Languages
 Vocational School

Institute (Masters Programmes for Graduates and Correspondence Courses) 
 Institute of Applied Science
 Institute of Social Science    
 Institute of Health Sciences

Literature 
 Istanbul Arel University in 100 Questions (Erasmus̟, Europass) Istanbul April 2018
 Enver Duran: Challenges of Higher Education Institutions in the Balkans, III Balkan Universities Network Meeting, Trakya Universität Edirne Mai 2010,

References

External links
 Official Website

Private universities and colleges in Turkey
2007 establishments in Turkey
Educational institutions established in 2007
Universities and colleges in Istanbul
Büyükçekmece